Parliamentary elections were held in Iceland on 9 June 1963. The Independence Party won 16 of the 40 seats in the Lower House of the Althing. Bjarni Benediktsson became Prime Minister after the elections.

Results

References

Elections in Iceland
Iceland
Parliament
Parliamentary elections in Iceland
Iceland